Seaside Frolics is a board game published in 1986 by San Serif.

Contents
Seaside Frolics is a game in which players visit an Edwardian seaside town to visit and collect postcards.

Reception
David Pritchard reviewed Seaside Frolics for Games International magazine, and gave it 4 stars out of 5, and stated that "Quibbles? Very few. The different direction arrows take a little getting used to and the board spaces are a trifle small for the tokens, but these discomforts vanish in the splendid nostalgia. Even those humble pennies depict either Edward or Victoria – how's that for realism?"

References

Board games introduced in 1986